Ağalı or Agaly may refer to:
Ağalı, Agdash, Azerbaijan
Ağalı, Barda, Azerbaijan
Ağalı, Zangilan (disambiguation)
Birinci Ağalı, Azerbaijan
İkinci Ağalı, Azerbaijan
Üçüncü Ağalı, Azerbaijan

See also
Agali (disambiguation)